The Beetaloo Reservoir is a currently unused reservoir in the southern Flinders Ranges locality of Beetaloo Valley in the hills east of Port Pirie in the Mid North region of South Australia.

The Beetaloo Reservoir no longer supplies drinking water and is kept as a reserve for a major outage on the Morgan-Whyalla pipeline and as a recreation and fishing reserve. It was built between 1886 and 1890 as a source for water to supply Yorke Peninsula. When it was built, Beetaloo Dam was considered the largest concrete dam in the southern hemisphere. It is now the smallest of SA Water's 16 reservoirs in South Australia. At the time of its construction, Yorke Peninsula was a developing agricultural base, as well as copper mining and smelting industry in the Copper Triangle area around Kadina, Wallaroo and Moonta.

The reservoir is in the traditional lands of the Nukunu people. The public lookout displays an artwork by Nukunu artist Jessica Turner titled Wobma. It shows the cultural and spiritual relationship the Nukunu people have with land and water in the Spencer Gulf and Southern Flinders Ranges.

Construction of the dam was part of a larger project that also included the excavation of storage reservoirs at Barunga in the northern Hummocks Range and Paskeville on the plateau at the top of Yorke Peninsula, and the pipes to supply them. The dam is sufficiently higher than Barunga that a pumping station is not required, and Barunga is higher than Paskeville.

References

Reservoirs in South Australia